Kostas Kapetanos  (born 27 October 1984) is a Greek footballer currently playing for A.E. Karaiskakis.

Career

Kapetanos began his senior career at Iraklis F.C. In Thessaloniki, he made 61 league appearances, scoring 5 goals. He played for Iraklis from 2003 to 2007. In 2007-2008 season, Kapetanos played for Panionios GSS, with giving 19 performances scoring 1 goal. Then, he transferred to Kerkyra F.C., and there made 14 appearances and scored 2 goals. After that, went to Panthrakikos F.C., playing in 7 matches. 2010-2011 was his best season, giving 23 performances for Ethnikos Olympiakos Volos F.C. and scored 3 fine goals. He prized with a joining to Aris Thessaloniki F.C.

After several hardships that put him out of the team, he managed to be back and on 28 December, scored a goal against Doxa Dramas.

On 24 January 2013, he returned to Olympiakos Volou 1937 F.C. He played for a year and then he joined Apollon Kalamarias playing in Football League.

Personal life
He is the younger brother of Pantelis Kapetanos.

References

External links
 
Guardian's Stats Centre

1984 births
Living people
Greek footballers
Association football midfielders
Iraklis Thessaloniki F.C. players
Kozani F.C. players
Panionios F.C. players
A.O. Kerkyra players
Panthrakikos F.C. players
Olympiacos Volos F.C. players
Aris Thessaloniki F.C. players
Apollon Pontou FC players
Kozani F.C. managers
Footballers from Ptolemaida